Omar James Jones IV is a United States Army lieutenant general who serves as the commanding general of the United States Army Installation Management Command since July 5, 2022. He most recently served as Deputy Commanding General of the United States Army Installation Management Command from July 2021 to July 2022. He previously commanded the United States Army Military District of Washington and Joint Force Headquarters National Capital Region from June 2019 to June 2021.

Born in Maryland where his father was attending dental school in Baltimore, Jones graduated from Glenelg High School in 1988. He then attended the United States Military Academy, serving as First Captain for his class and graduating in 1992 with a B.S. degree in operations research. Jones later earned a Master of Public Administration degree from Harvard University and a master's degree in national security strategy from the National War College.

Personal 
Jones is the son of Dr. Omar J. Jones III and Carol Jones. His father was a dentist who served as an Army Dental Corps captain from 1973 to 1976. Jones has two sisters.

Jones married his high school classmate Tracey Scott at West Point one day after his graduation in 1992. They have three sons, two of whom have also graduated from West Point.

References

External links

Year of birth missing (living people)
Living people
United States Military Academy alumni
Military personnel from Maryland
United States Army Rangers
Harvard Kennedy School alumni
National War College alumni
Recipients of the Meritorious Service Medal (United States)
Recipients of the Legion of Merit
United States Army generals
Recipients of the Defense Superior Service Medal
Recipients of the Distinguished Service Medal (US Army)